Colorado Academy is an independent nonsectarian, co-educational, college preparatory day school for students from Pre-Kindergarten through Twelfth Grade. The school's  campus is located in Lakewood, Colorado, and serves approximately 1000 students. The program is based on academics, arts and athletics. CA follows a trimester calendar, with grades issued at the conclusion of each term. Classes in all divisions follow a six-day rotating schedule.

History

Colorado Academy was established in 1906 as the Hill School for Boys in the Capitol Hill neighborhood in Denver, Colorado, and by 1923 was called the Colorado Military School. Military training was incorporated into the curriculum. The school outgrew its space during World War II and in 1947, moved from its location near the University of Denver to its present location in Lakewood, just outside the Denver city limits. In 1955, the school began shifting its focus away from military training. Under the leadership of F. Charles Froelicher, Colorado Academy emerged as a college preparatory school for boys. The school became coeducational in 1971.

Today, the school has three different divisions: Lower School, Pre-Kindergarten – Grade 5, Middle School, Grades 6–8, and Upper School, Grades 9–12. The curriculum emphasizes group and individual study of the liberal arts and sciences, as well as engagement through experiential and service learning.

Campus
The school's present campus was purchased in 1947. Known as the Kirk estate, it was the country home of Jesse Welborn, president of the Colorado Fuel and Iron Company.  The campus has buildings for each division,  including a state-of-the-art upper school that opened in January 2013, that features an innovation laboratory, expanded science labs and classrooms. The campus includes two libraries: a lower school library and the Raether Library, the Ponzio Arts Center, the Schotters Music Building, the historic Welborn House, Smith Center, a new field house and athletic center, a campus center and bookstore, and a recently renovated performing arts center.  The CA campus also has a number of athletic fields, such as Stuie's Courts (8) (Tennis), Wright Field, Simms Field,  Firman Field, Slater Field (turf) and a baseball field that was renovated in 2014. A new turf field is under construction.

Notable alumni

Mark Hubbard, PGA Golfer
Teel Bivins, United States Ambassador to Sweden, 2004–06, Tulane University, SMU
Paul Wylie, Olympic figure skater
Dorothy Hamill, Olympic Champion 1976 figure skater

Former headmasters
F. Charles Froelicher (1955–1975)
Sir Frank Wallace (1976–1990)
Christopher H. Babbs (1991–2008)
Mike Davis (2009–Present)

Ranking
According to Niche, Colorado Academy ranks as #1 in Best Private K-12 School in Colorado and is among the top 100 of all private schools nationwide.

References

External links
 

High schools in Lakewood, Colorado
Educational institutions established in 1906
Private K-12 schools in Colorado
Private high schools in Colorado
Private middle schools in Colorado
Private elementary schools in Colorado
Preparatory schools in Colorado
1906 establishments in Colorado